Cilia- and flagella-associated protein 299 (CFAP299), is a protein that in humans is encoded by the CFAP299 gene. CFAP299 is predicted to play a role in spermatogenesis and cell apoptosis.

Gene

Location 
CFAP299 gene is located at chromosome 4, 4q21.21 spanning 642,492 bases from position 80,321,265 to position 80,963,756 on the plus strand. CFAP299 gene is also known as C4orf22, chromosome 4 Open Reading Frame 22 and Uncharacterized Protein C4orf22. CFAP299 gene is located near MRPS25P1 and BMP3 and it has 13 exons.

Expression 
CFAP299 is widely expressed in a variety of normal tissue in Homo sapiens . CFAP299 is highly expressed in testis, trachea, lung, fetal lung and epididymis.  In terms of health state, CFAP299 has a decreased expression level in glioma, germ cell tumors and chondrosarcoma. An even higher expression of CFAP299 is shown in condition of soft tissue tumor and muscle tissue tumor. CFAP299 is only exist in fetus and adult.

Promoter 
The promoter of CFAP299 gene is predicted to present 1000 base pairs upstream of the start of transcription. A variety of transcription factors such as CCAAT binding factors, X-box binding factors and AT rich interactive domain factor bind to promoter to regulate the sequence.

mRNA

Splice variants
CFAP299 has 9 alternatively spliced variants and 1 unspliced form.

Protein

General feature 
CFAP299 protein contains 233 amino acids in length. The molecular weight of Homo sapiens CFAP299 protein is 26869 Da and the predicted isoelectric point is 5.28. Total number of negatively charged residues is 39 and total number of positively charged residues is 33. Aspartic acid has a higher frequency in CFAP299 protein than in other human proteins.

Isoforms 
CFAP299 protein has two important isoforms. Cilia- and flagella-associated protein 299 isoform 1 is the longest isoform and cilia- and flagella-associated protein 299 isoform 2 is chosen as canonical sequence, which is also the target for this article.

Domains 
There is only one conserved domain DUF4464 from position 13 to position 232 in CFAP299 protein. This domain belongs to DUF4464 family, which is found in eukaryotes and the proteins in this family has a length of 224 to 241 amino acids. This domain is conserved through the orthologs of CFAP299 as indicated by BLAST.

Secondary structure 
CFAP299 proteins secondary structure is dominated by alpha helix and random coil as predicted by GOR4.

Tertiary structure 
Tertiary structure of CFAP299 protein predicted by I-TASSER showed that the protein is comprised by alpha helix and coils.

Post-translational modifications 
CFAP299 is predicted to undergo phosphorylation in various site as shown in graph. CFAP299 also predicted to have sumoylation site in position 58, 137 and 232 and two SUMO-interaction Motifs in position 45-49 and 212-216.

Subcellular localization 
CFAP299 protein is targeted to cytoplasm.

Interacting proteins 
CFAP299 protein is believed to interact with amyloid beta (A4) precursor protein (APP) and BCL2-associated athanogene 3 (BCL2).

Evolution

OrthologS 
CFAP299 protein orthologs exists in mammals, reptiles, birds, amphibians, fish, sponges, sea urchins, insects, fungi and plants. Its most distant relative appear in plants. The table below shows orthologs found by BLAST.

Paralog 
There are no parlogs for CFAP299.

Clinical significance 
CFAP299 expression is lowered in people with teratozoospermia,  a condition that causes abnormal morphology of sperm and decreased fertility.

In airway epithelial cells that had excessive mucous secretion, a condition that simulated chronic lung disease, CFAP299 showed a reduced expression.

References